Cosmin Bărcăuan (born 5 August 1978) is a Romanian football coach and a former player. At the beginning of his career, Bărcăuan played as a striker, but when he arrived at Dinamo București, coach Ioan Andone started using him as a defender.

International career
From 2000 until 2004, Bărcăuan made 8 appearances and scored two goals for Romania, making his debut when he came as a substitute and replaced Adrian Mutu in the 52nd minute of a friendly in which he scored the second goal of a 2–1 victory against FR Yugoslavia. He scored his second goal for the national team in a friendly which ended with a 3–2 away victory against Algeria. 
Bărcăuan's last four games for Romania were at the 2006 World Cup qualifiers.

Honours

Player
Bihor Oradea
Divizia C: 1997–98
Dinamo București
Divizia A: 2003–04
Cupa României: 2002–03, 2003–04
Shakhtar Donetsk
Ukrainian Premier League: 2004–05, 2005–06

Notes

References

External links

Cosmin Bărcăuan at superleaguegreece.net

1978 births
Living people
Sportspeople from Oradea
Romanian footballers
Association football defenders
Romania international footballers
FC Bihor Oradea players
ACF Gloria Bistrița players
FC Dinamo București players
FC U Craiova 1948 players
FC Shakhtar Donetsk players
PFC Krylia Sovetov Samara players
PAOK FC players
OFI Crete F.C. players
CSM Ceahlăul Piatra Neamț players
Liga I players
Liga II players
Liga III players
Ukrainian Premier League players
Russian Premier League players
Super League Greece players
Romanian expatriate footballers
Expatriate footballers in Ukraine
Romanian expatriate sportspeople in Ukraine
Expatriate footballers in Russia
Romanian expatriate sportspeople in Russia
Expatriate footballers in Greece
Romanian expatriate sportspeople in Greece
Romanian football managers
Expatriate football managers in Greece